El ángel caído or variants may refer to:

El ángel caído (TV series), a 1985 Mexican telenovela
El ángel caído (album) or the title song, by Avalanch, 2001
El ángel caído, a 1949 film directed by Juan José Ortega
Ángel caído (film), a 2010 Mexican film featuring Humberto Zurita
"Ángeles caídos", a song by Attaque 77 from Trapos, 2001

See also
Fuente del Ángel Caído, a fountain in Buen Retiro Park, Madrid, Spain